Ludwig Munzinger Jr. (24 February 1921 – 7 April 2012) was a German publisher of Munzinger-Archiv who took over his father's  business in 1957. Munzinger Jr. died on 7 April 2012.

References

1921 births
2012 deaths
German editors
People from Ravensburg
German publishers (people)
Opinion journalists
Recipients of the Order of Merit of Baden-Württemberg